"Clap & Love / Why" is the 6th single from Ayaka and her first double A-side single.

Overview
The single was released in three pressings, the first included a "Final Fantasy Crisis Core" sticker, the second came with a regular CD single and the third with a CD+DVD release renamed "Why / Clap & Love". "Clap & Love" was being used as the opening theme to the comedic J-Drama Jigoku no Sata mo Yome Shidai. "Why" was used as the theme song to the game Crisis Core: Final Fantasy VII.

Tracks

Charts

Oricon sales chart (Japan)

References

2007 singles
Ayaka songs
Japanese television drama theme songs
2007 songs
Warner Music Japan singles
Songs written by Ayaka